Saif Al-Mohannadi (Arabic:سيف المهندي) (born 14 April 1997) is a Qatari footballer. He currently plays for Muaither.

References

Qatari footballers
1997 births
Living people
Al-Khor SC players
Muaither SC players
Qatar Stars League players
Qatari Second Division players
Association football midfielders